The 2004 Radio Disney Music Awards was an awards show held Radio Disney studios. Hilary Duff, as in 2003, was the biggest winner that year. The award was broadcast on the Radio Disney network.

Nominees and winners

Best Female Artist
Hilary Duff
Avril Lavigne
JoJo

Best Male Artist
Usher
Lil' Romeo
Justin Timberlake

Best Group
Black Eyed Peas
Maroon 5
The Cheetah Girls

Best Song
"Come Clean" – Hilary Duff
"Don't Tell Me" – Avril Lavigne
"Leave (Get Out)" – JoJo

Best New Artist
Ashlee Simpson
JoJo
Lindsay Lohan

Best Actress Turned Singer
Hilary Duff
Lindsay Lohan
Mandy Moore

Best Song to Watch Your Dad Sing
"Drama Queen (That Girl)" – Lindsay Lohan
"The Little Voice" – Hilary Duff
"Pieces of Me" – Ashlee Simpson

Best TV Movie Song
"Cinderella" – Cheetah Girls
"What Dreams Are Made Of" – Hilary Duff
Drama Queen (That Girl)" – Lindsay Lohan

Best Homework Song
"The Math" – Hilary Duff
"Breakaway" – Kelly Clarkson
"Cinderella" – Cheetah Girls

Best Song to Air Guitar
"My Happy Ending" – Avril Lavigne
"Breakaway" – Kelly Clarkson
"The Little Voice" – Hilary Duff

Best Video That Rocks
"Leave (Get Out)" – JoJo
"Breakaway" – Kelly Clarkson
"Come Clean" by Hilary Duff

Best Song to Dance
"Let's Get It Started" by Black Eyed Peas
"Cinderella" – Cheetah Girls
"Girl Power – Cheetah Girls

Most Rockin' Relative
Hilary Duff and Haylie Duff
Cheetah Girls

Most Stylish Singer
Hilary Duff
Amanda Bynes
Lindsay Lohan

References

External links
Official website

Radio Disney Music Awards
Radio Disney Music Awards
Radio Disney
2004 awards in the United States